A cardinal is a senior member of the clergy of the Catholic Church. Cardinals are created by the current pope and typically hold the title for life. Collectively, they constitute the College of Cardinals.

The most solemn responsibility of the cardinals is to elect a new pope in a conclave, almost always from among themselves (with a few historical exceptions), when the Holy See is vacant. During the period between a pope's death or resignation and the election of his successor, the day-to-day governance of the Holy See is in the hands of the College of Cardinals. The right to participate in a conclave is limited to cardinals who have not reached the age of 80 years by the day the vacancy occurs. In addition, cardinals collectively participate in papal consistories (which generally take place annually), in which matters of importance to the Church are considered and new cardinals may be created. Cardinals of working age are also appointed to roles overseeing dicasteries of the Roman Curia, the central administration of the Catholic Church.

Cardinals are drawn from a variety of backgrounds, being appointed as cardinals in addition to their existing roles within the Church. Most cardinals are bishops and archbishops leading dioceses and archdioceses around the world – often the most prominent diocese or archdiocese in their country. Others are titular bishops who are current or former officials within the Roman Curia (generally the leaders of dicasteries and other bodies linked with the Curia). A very small number are priests recognised by the pope for their service to the Church; as canon law requires them to be generally consecrated as bishops before they are made cardinals, but some are granted a papal dispensation. There are no strict criteria for elevation to the College of Cardinals. Since 1917, a potential cardinal must already be at least a priest, but laymen have been cardinals in the past. The selection is entirely up to the pope and tradition is his only guide.

 there are  serving cardinals, of whom  are eligible to vote in a conclave to elect a new pope.

History

There is general disagreement about the origin of the term, but a chief consensus that "cardinalis" is etymologically from the Latin word  (meaning "pivot" or "hinge") was first used in late antiquity to designate a bishop or priest who was incorporated into a church for which he had not originally been ordained. In Rome the first persons to be called cardinals were the deacons of the seven regions of the city at the beginning of the 6th century, when the word began to mean "principal", "eminent", or "superior". The name was also given to the senior priest in each of the "title" churches (the parish churches) of Rome and to the bishops of the seven sees surrounding the city. By the 8th century the Roman cardinals constituted a privileged class among the Roman clergy. They took part in the administration of the church of Rome and in the papal liturgy. By decree of a synod of 769, only a cardinal was eligible to become Bishop of Rome. Cardinals were granted the privilege of wearing the red hat by Pope Innocent IV in 1244.

In cities other than Rome, the name cardinal began to be applied to certain church men as a mark of honour. The earliest example of this occurs in a letter sent by Pope Zacharias in 747 to Pippin III (the Short), ruler of the Franks, in which Zacharias applied the title to the priests of Paris to distinguish them from country clergy. This meaning of the word spread rapidly, and from the 9th century various episcopal cities had a special class among the clergy known as cardinals. The use of the title was reserved for the cardinals of Rome in 1567 by Pius V.

In 1059 (five years after the East-West Schism), the right of electing the pope was reserved to the principal clergy of Rome and the bishops of the seven suburbicarian sees. In the 12th century the practice of appointing ecclesiastics from outside Rome as cardinals began, with each of them assigned a church in Rome as his titular church or linked with one of the suburbicarian dioceses, while still being incardinated in a diocese other than that of Rome.

The term cardinal at one time applied to any priest permanently assigned or incardinated to a church, or specifically to the senior priest of an important church, based on the Latin cardo (hinge), meaning "pivotal" as in "principal" or "chief". The term was applied in this sense as early as the 9th century to the priests of the tituli (parishes) of the diocese of Rome.

In the year 1563, the Ecumenical Council of Trent, headed by Pope Pius IV, wrote about the importance of selecting good cardinals: "nothing is more necessary to the Church of God than that the holy Roman pontiff apply that solicitude which by the duty of his office he owes the universal Church in a very special way by associating with himself as cardinals the most select persons only, and appoint to each church most eminently upright and competent shepherds; and this the more so, because our Lord Jesus Christ will require at his hands the blood of the sheep of Christ that perish through the evil government of shepherds who are negligent and forgetful of their office."

The earlier influence of temporal rulers, notably the Kings of France, reasserted itself through the influence of cardinals of certain nationalities or politically significant movements. Traditions even developed entitling certain monarchs, including those of Austria, Spain, and France, to nominate one of their trusted clerical subjects to be created cardinal, a so-called "crown-cardinal".

In early modern times, cardinals often had important roles in secular affairs. In some cases, they took on powerful positions in government. In Henry VIII's England, his chief minister was for some time Cardinal Wolsey. Cardinal Richelieu's power was so great that he was for many years effectively the ruler of France. Richelieu's successor was also a cardinal, Jules Mazarin. Guillaume Dubois and André-Hercule de Fleury complete the list of the four great cardinals to have ruled France. In Portugal, due to a succession crisis, one cardinal, Henry of Portugal, was crowned king, the only example of a cardinal-king.

While the incumbents of some sees are regularly made cardinals, and some countries are entitled to at least one cardinal by concordate (usually earning either its primate or the metropolitan of the capital city the cardinal's hat), almost no see carries an actual right to the cardinalate, not even if its bishop is a Patriarch: the notable exception is the Patriarch of Lisbon who, by Pope Clement XII's 1737 bull Inter praecipuas apostolici ministerii, is accorded the right to be elevated to the rank of cardinal in the consistory following their appointment.

Papal elections

In 1059, Pope Nicholas II gave cardinals the right to elect the Bishop of Rome in the papal bull In nomine Domini. For a time this power was assigned exclusively to the cardinal bishops, but in 1179 the Third Lateran Council restored the right to the whole body of cardinals.

Numbers

In 1586, Pope Sixtus V limited the number of cardinals to 70: six cardinal bishops, 50 cardinal priests, and 14 cardinal deacons. Pope John XXIII exceeded that limit citing the need to staff Church offices. In November 1970 in Ingravescentem aetatem, Pope Paul VI established that electors would be under the age of eighty years. When it took effect on 1 January 1971, it deprived twenty-five cardinals of the right to participate in a conclave. In October 1975 in Romano Pontifici eligendo, he set the maximum number of electors at 120, while establishing no limit on the overall size of the college.

Popes can set aside church laws and they have regularly brought the number of cardinals under the age of 80 to more than 120, twice reaching as high as 135 with Pope John Paul II's consistories of February 2001 and October 2003. No more than 120 electors have ever participated in a conclave, but most canon lawyers believe that if their number exceeded 120 they would all participate.

Pope Paul VI also increased the number of cardinal bishops by assigning that rank, in 1965, to patriarchs of the Eastern Catholic Churches when named cardinals. In 2018, Pope Francis expanded the cardinal bishops of Roman title, because this had not been done despite recent decades' expansion in the two lower orders of cardinals, besides having all six such cardinals being over the age limit for a conclave.

Titular churches

Each cardinal is assigned a titular church upon his creation, which is always a church in the city of Rome. Through the process of opting (optazione), a cardinal can raise through the ranks from cardinal deacon to priest, and from cardinal priest to that of cardinal bishop - in which case he obtains one of the suburbicarian sees located around the city of Rome. The only exception is for patriarchs of the Eastern Catholic Churches. Nevertheless, cardinals possess no power of governance nor are they to intervene in any way in matters which pertain to the administration of goods, discipline, or the service of their titular churches. They are allowed to celebrate Mass and hear confessions and lead visits and pilgrimages to their titular churches, in coordination with the staff of the church. They often support their churches monetarily, and many cardinals do keep in contact with the pastoral staffs of their titular churches. The term cardinal is from the Latin word "cardo" meaning a hinge. Here it means a "door", an example of synecdoche, a figure of speech whereby the part refers to the whole. The "door" is the address of the titular church from which the cardinal derives his membership of the Roman clergy, who elect the pope.

The Dean of the College of Cardinals in addition to such a titular church also receives the titular bishopric of Ostia, the primary suburbicarian see. Cardinals governing a particular church retain that church.

Title and reference style

In 1630, Pope Urban VIII decreed their title to be Eminence (previously, it had been "illustrissimo" and "reverendissimo") and decreed that their secular rank would equate to Prince, making them secondary only to the pope and crowned monarchs.

In accordance with tradition, they sign by placing the title "Cardinal" (abbreviated Card.) after their personal name and before their surname as, for instance, "John Card(inal) Doe" or, in Latin, "Ioannes Card(inalis) Doe". Some writers, such as James-Charles Noonan, hold that, in the case of cardinals, the form used for signatures should be used also when referring to them in English. However, official sources, such as the Catholic News Service, say that the correct form for referring to a cardinal in English is normally as "Cardinal [First name] [Surname]". This is the rule given also in stylebooks not associated with the church. This style is also generally followed on the websites of the Holy See and episcopal conferences. Oriental patriarchs who are created cardinals customarily use "Sanctae Ecclesiae Cardinalis" as their full title, probably because they do not belong to the Roman clergy.

The [First name] Cardinal [Surname] order is used in the Latin proclamation of the election of a new pope by the cardinal protodeacon, if the new pope is a cardinal, as it has been since 1378.

Orders and their chief offices

Cardinal bishops 

Cardinal bishops (cardinals of the episcopal order) are the senior order of cardinals. Though in modern times the vast majority of cardinals are also bishops or archbishops, few are "cardinal bishops". For most of the second millennium there were six cardinal bishops, each presiding over one of the seven suburbicarian sees around Rome: Ostia, Albano, Porto and Santa Rufina, Palestrina, Sabina and Mentana, Frascati, and Velletri. Velletri was united with Ostia from 1150 until 1914, when Pope Pius X separated them again, but decreed that whichever cardinal bishop became Dean of the College of Cardinals would keep the suburbicarian see he already held, adding to it that of Ostia, with the result that there continued to be only six cardinal bishops. Since 1962, the cardinal bishops have only a titular relationship with the suburbicarian sees, each of which is governed by a separate ordinary.

Until 1961, membership in the order of cardinal bishops was achieved through precedence in the College of Cardinals. When a suburbicarian see fell vacant, the most senior cardinal by precedence could exercise his option to claim the see and be promoted to the order of cardinal bishops. Pope John XXIII abolished that privilege on 10 March 1961 and made the right to promote someone to the order of cardinal bishops the sole prerogative of the pope.

In 1965, Pope Paul VI decreed in his motu proprio Ad purpuratorum Patrum Collegium that patriarchs of the Eastern Catholic Churches who were named cardinals (i.e. "cardinal patriarchs") would also be cardinal bishops, ranking after the six Roman rite cardinal bishops of the suburbicarian sees. (Latin Church patriarchs who become cardinals are cardinal priests, not cardinal bishops: for example Angelo Scola was made Patriarch of Venice in 2002 and cardinal priest of Santi XII Apostoli in 2003.) Those of cardinal patriarch rank continue to hold their patriarchal see and are not assigned any Roman title (suburbicarian see or title or deaconry).

At the June 2018 consistory, Pope Francis increased the number of Latin Church cardinal bishops to match the expansion in cardinal priests and cardinal deacons in recent decades. He elevated four cardinals to this rank granting their titular churches and deaconries suburbicarian rank pro hac vice (temporarily) and making them equivalent to suburbicarian see titles. At the time of the announcement, all six cardinal bishops of suburbicarian see titles, as well as two of the three cardinal patriarchs, were non-electors because of having reached age 80. Pope Francis created another cardinal bishop in the same way on 1 May 2020, bringing the number of Latin Church cardinal bishops to eleven.

The Dean of the College of Cardinals, the highest ranking cardinal, was formerly the longest serving cardinal bishop, but since 1965 is elected by the Latin Church cardinal bishops from among their number, subject to papal approval. Likewise the Vice-Dean, formerly the second longest serving, is also elected. Seniority of the remaining Latin Church cardinal bishops is still by date of appointment to the rank. For a period ending in the mid-20th century, long-serving cardinal priests were entitled to fill vacancies that arose among the cardinal bishops, just as cardinal deacons of ten years' standing are still entitled to become cardinal priests.

Cardinal priests 

Cardinal priests are the most numerous of the three orders of cardinals in the Catholic Church, ranking above the cardinal deacons and below the cardinal bishops. Those who are named cardinal priests today are generally also bishops of important dioceses throughout the world, though some hold Curial positions.

In modern times, the name "cardinal priest" is interpreted as meaning a cardinal who is of the order of priests. Originally, however, this referred to certain key priests of important churches of the Diocese of Rome, who were recognized as the cardinal priests, the important priests chosen by the pope to advise him in his duties as Bishop of Rome (the Latin cardo means "hinge"). Certain clerics in many dioceses at the time, not just that of Rome, were said to be the key personnel—the term gradually became exclusive to Rome to indicate those entrusted with electing the Bishop of Rome, the pope.

While the cardinalate has long been expanded beyond the Roman pastoral clergy and Roman Curia, every cardinal priest has a titular church in Rome, though they may be bishops or archbishops elsewhere, just as cardinal bishops were given one of the suburbicarian dioceses around Rome. Pope Paul VI abolished all administrative rights cardinals had with regard to their titular churches, though the cardinal's name and coat of arms are still posted in the church, and they are expected to celebrate Mass and preach there if convenient when they are in Rome.

While the number of cardinals was small from the times of the Roman Empire to the Renaissance, and frequently smaller than the number of recognized churches entitled to a cardinal priest, in the 16th century the college expanded markedly. In 1587, Pope Sixtus V sought to arrest this growth by fixing the maximum size of the college at 70, including 50 cardinal priests, about twice the historical number. This limit was respected until 1958, and the list of titular churches modified only on rare occasions, generally when a building fell into disrepair. When Pope John XXIII abolished the limit, he began to add new churches to the list, which Popes Paul VI and John Paul II continued to do. Today there are close to 150 titular churches, out of over 300 churches in Rome.

The cardinal who is the longest-serving member of the order of cardinal priests is titled cardinal protopriest. He had certain ceremonial duties in the conclave that have effectively ceased because he would generally have already reached age 80, at which cardinals are barred from the conclave. The current cardinal protopriest is Michael Michai Kitbunchu of Thailand.

Cardinal deacons 

The cardinal deacons are the lowest-ranking cardinals. Cardinals elevated to the diaconal order are either officials of the Roman Curia or priests elevated after their 80th birthday. Bishops with diocesan responsibilities, however, are created cardinal priests.

Cardinal deacons derive originally from the seven deacons in the Papal Household who supervised the Church's works in the seven districts of Rome during the early Middle Ages, when church administration was effectively the government of Rome and provided all social services. They came to be called "cardinal deacons" by the late eighth century, and they were granted active rights in papal elections and made eligible for the election as pope by the decree of 769.

Cardinals elevated to the diaconal order are mainly officials of the Roman Curia holding various posts in the church administration. Their number and influence has varied through the years. While historically predominantly Italian the group has become much more internationally diverse in later years. While in 1939 about half were Italian by 1994 the number was reduced to one third. Their influence in the election of the pope has been considered important. They are better informed and connected than the dislocated cardinals but their level of unity has been varied. Under the 1587 decree of Pope Sixtus V, which fixed the maximum size of the College of Cardinals, there were 14 cardinal deacons. Later the number increased. As late as 1939 almost half of the cardinals were members of the curia. Pius XII reduced this percentage to 24 percent. John XXIII brought it back up to 37 percent but Paul VI brought it down to 27 percent where John Paul II maintained this ratio.

As of 2005, there were over 50 churches recognized as cardinalatial deaconries, though there were only 30 cardinals of the order of deacons. Cardinal deacons have long enjoyed the right to "opt for the order of cardinal priests" (optazione) after they have been cardinal deacons for 10 years. They may on such elevation take a vacant "title" (a church allotted to a cardinal priest as the church in Rome with which he is associated) or their diaconal church may be temporarily elevated to a cardinal priest's "title" for that occasion. When elevated to cardinal priests, they take their precedence according to the day they were first made cardinal deacons (thus ranking above cardinal priests who were elevated to the college after them, regardless of order).

When not celebrating Mass but still serving a liturgical function, such as the semiannual Urbi et Orbi papal blessing, some Papal Masses and some events at Ecumenical Councils, cardinal deacons can be recognized by the dalmatics they would don with the simple white mitre (so called mitra simplex).

Cardinal protodeacon 

The cardinal protodeacon is the senior cardinal deacon in order of appointment to the College of Cardinals. If he is a cardinal elector and participates in a conclave, he announces a new pope's election and name from the central balcony of St. Peter's Basilica in Vatican City. The protodeacon also bestows the pallium on the new pope and crowns him with the papal tiara, although the crowning has not been celebrated since Pope John Paul I opted for a simpler papal inauguration ceremony in 1978. The current cardinal protodeacon is Renato Raffaele Martino.

Cardinal protodeacons since 1887 

 Giuseppe Pecci, S.J. (20 December 1887 – 8 February 1890)
 John Henry Newman, C.O. (8 February 1890 – 11 August 1890)
 Joseph Hergenröther (11 August 1890 – 3 October 1890)
 Tommaso Maria Zigliara,, O.P. (3 October 1890 – 1 June 1891)
 Isidoro Verga (1 June 1891 – 22 June 1896)
 Luigi Macchi (22 June 1896 – 29 March 1907)
 Andreas Steinhuber, S.J. (29 March 1907 – 15 October 1907)
 Francesco Segna (15 October 1907 – 4 January 1911)
 Francesco Salesio Della Volpe (4 January 1911 – 5 November 1916†); announced election of Pope Benedict XV (1914)
 Gaetano Bisleti (5 November 1916 – 17 December 1928*); announced election of Pope Pius XI (1922)
 Camillo Laurenti (17 December 1928 – 16 December 1935*)
 Camillo Caccia-Dominioni (16 December 1935 – 12 November 1946†); announced election of Pope Pius XII (1939)
 Nicola Canali (12 November 1946 – 3 August 1961†); announced election of Pope John XXIII (1958)
 Alfredo Ottaviani (3 August 1961 – 26 June 1967*); announced election of Pope Paul VI (1963)
 Arcadio Larraona Saralegui, CMF (26 June 1967 – 28 April 1969*)
 William Theodore Heard (28 April 1969 – 18 May 1970*)
 Antonio Bacci (18 May 1970 – 20 January 1971†)
 Michael Browne, OP (20 January 1971 – 31 March 1971†)
 Federico Callori di Vignale (31 March 1971 – 8 August 1971†)
 Charles Journet (8 August 1971 – 5 March 1973*)
 Pericle Felici (5 March 1973 – 30 June 1979*); announced elections of Pope John Paul I (1978) and Pope John Paul II (1978)
 Sergio Pignedoli (30 June 1979 – 15 June 1980†)
 Umberto Mozzoni (15 June 1980 – 2 February 1983*)
 Opilio Rossi (2 February 1983 – 22 June 1987*)
 Giuseppe Caprio (22 June 1987 – 26 November 1990*)
 Aurelio Sabattani (26 November 1990 – 5 April 1993*)
 Duraisamy Simon Lourdusamy (5 April 1993 – 29 January 1996*)
 Eduardo Martínez Somalo (29 January 1996 – 9 January 1999*)
 Pio Laghi (9 January 1999 – 26 February 2002*)
 Luigi Poggi (26 February 2002 – 24 February 2005*)
 Jorge Medina (24 February 2005 – 23 February 2007*); announced election of Pope Benedict XVI (2005)
 Darío Castrillón Hoyos (23 February 2007 – 1 March 2008*)
 Agostino Cacciavillan (1 March 2008 – 21 February 2011*)
 Jean-Louis Tauran (21 February 2011 – 12 June 2014*); announced election of Pope Francis (2013)
 Renato Raffaele Martino (12 June 2014 –)

* Ceased to be protodeacon upon being raised to the order of cardinal-priest† Was protodeacon at time of death

Special types of cardinals

Camerlengo

The Cardinal Camerlengo of the Holy Roman Church, assisted by the Vice-Camerlengo and the other prelates of the office known as the Apostolic Camera, has functions that in essence are limited to a period of sede vacante of the papacy. He is to collate information about the financial situation of all administrations dependent on the Holy See and present the results to the College of Cardinals, as they gather for the papal conclave.

Cardinals who are not bishops

Until 1918, any cleric, even one only in minor orders, could be created a cardinal (see "lay cardinals", below), but enrolled only in the order of cardinal deacons. For example, in the 16th century, Reginald Pole was a cardinal for 18 years before he was ordained a priest. The 1917 Code of Canon Law mandated that all cardinals, even cardinal deacons, had to be priests, and, in 1962, Pope John XXIII set the norm that all cardinals be consecrated as bishops, even if they are only priests at the time of appointment. As a consequence of these two changes, canon 351 of the 1983 Code of Canon Law requires that a cardinal be at least in the order of priesthood at his appointment, and that those who are not already bishops must receive episcopal consecration. Several cardinals near to or over the age of 80 or when appointed have obtained dispensation from the rule of having to be a bishop. These were all appointed cardinal-deacons, but Roberto Tucci and Albert Vanhoye lived long enough to exercise the right of option and be promoted to the rank of cardinal-priest.

A cardinal who is not a bishop is entitled to wear and use the episcopal vestments and other pontificalia (episcopal regalia: mitre, crozier, zucchetto, pectoral cross, and ring). He has both actual and honorary precedence over patriarchs, archbishops, and bishops who are not cardinals. However, he cannot perform the sacrament of ordination or other rites reserved solely to bishops. The prominent priests who since 1962 were not ordained bishops on their elevation to the cardinalate were over the age of 80 or near to it, and so no cardinal who was not a bishop has participated in recent papal conclaves.

"Lay cardinals"

At various times, there have been cardinals who had only received first tonsure and minor orders but not yet been ordained as deacons or priests. Though clerics, they were inaccurately called "lay cardinals". Teodolfo Mertel was among the last of the lay cardinals. When he died in 1899 he was the last surviving cardinal who was not at least ordained a priest. With the revision of the Code of Canon Law promulgated in 1917 by Pope Benedict XV, only those who are already priests or bishops may be appointed cardinals. Since the time of Pope John XXIII a priest who is appointed a cardinal must be consecrated a bishop, unless he obtains a dispensation.

Cardinals in pectore or secret cardinals

In addition to the named cardinals, the pope may name secret cardinals or cardinals in pectore (Latin for in the breast). During the Western Schism, many cardinals were created by the contending popes. Beginning with the reign of Pope Martin V, cardinals were created without publishing their names until later, a practice termed creati et reservati in pectore. A cardinal named in pectore is known only to the pope. In the modern era, popes have named cardinals in pectore to protect them or their congregations from political reprisals. If conditions change, the pope makes the appointment public. The cardinal in question then ranks in precedence with those made cardinals at the time of his in pectore appointment. If a pope dies before revealing the identity of an in pectore cardinal, the person's status as cardinal expires. The last pope known to have named a cardinal in pectore is Pope John Paul II, who named four, including one whose identity was never revealed.

Vesture and privileges

When in choir dress, a Latin Church cardinal wears scarlet garments—the blood-like red symbolizes a cardinal's willingness to die for his faith. Excluding the rochet — which is always white—the scarlet garments include the cassock, mozzetta, and biretta (over the usual scarlet zucchetto). The biretta of a cardinal is distinctive not merely for its scarlet color, but also for the fact that it does not have a pompon or tassel on the top as do the birettas of other prelates. Until the 1460s, it was customary for cardinals to wear a violet or blue cape unless granted the privilege of wearing red when acting on papal business. His normal-wear cassock is black but has scarlet piping and a scarlet fascia (sash). Occasionally, a cardinal wears a scarlet ferraiolo which is a cape worn over the shoulders, tied at the neck in a bow by narrow strips of cloth in the front, without any 'trim' or piping on it. It is because of the scarlet color of cardinals' vesture that the bird of the same name has become known as such.

Eastern Catholic cardinals continue to wear the normal dress appropriate to their liturgical tradition, though some may line their cassocks with scarlet and wear scarlet fascias, or in some cases, wear Eastern-style cassocks entirely of scarlet.

In previous times, at the consistory at which the pope named a new cardinal, he would bestow upon him a distinctive wide-brimmed hat called a galero. This custom was discontinued in 1969 and the investiture now takes place with the scarlet biretta. In ecclesiastical heraldry, however, the scarlet galero is still displayed on the cardinal's coat of arms. Cardinals had the right to display the galero in their cathedral, and when a cardinal died, it would be suspended from the ceiling above his tomb. Some cardinals will still have a galero made, even though it is not officially part of their apparel.

To symbolize their bond with the papacy, the pope gives each newly appointed cardinal a gold ring, which is traditionally kissed by Catholics when greeting a cardinal (as with a bishop's episcopal ring). Before the new uniformity imposed by John Paul II, each cardinal was given a ring, the central piece of which was a gem, usually a sapphire, with the pope's stemma engraved on the inside. There is now no gemstone, and the pope chooses the image on the outside: under Pope Benedict XVI it was a modern depiction of the crucifixion of Jesus, with Mary and John to each side. The ring includes the pope's coat of arms on the inside.

Cardinals have in canon law a "privilege of forum" (i.e., exemption from being judged by ecclesiastical tribunals of ordinary rank): only the pope is competent to judge them in matters subject to ecclesiastical jurisdiction (cases that refer to matters that are spiritual or linked with the spiritual, or with regard to infringement of ecclesiastical laws and whatever contains an element of sin, where culpability must be determined and the appropriate
ecclesiastical penalty imposed). The pope either decides the case himself or delegates the decision to a tribunal, usually one of the tribunals or congregations of the Roman Curia. Without such delegation, no ecclesiastical court, even the Roman Rota, is competent to judge a canon law case against a cardinal.

Additionally, canon law gives cardinals the faculty of hearing confessions validly and licitly everywhere, whereas other priests and bishops must be granted this faculty and might be restricted in its use by the local bishop.

See also

 Cardinal-Infante (disambiguation)
 Cardinal-nephew
 Cardinal protector
 Hierarchy of the Catholic Church
 List of current cardinals
 List of the creations of the cardinals

Notes

References

Bibliography

 
 

 
 
 
 Hollingswirth, Mary, Miles Pattenden and Arnold Witte, eds (2020), A Companion to the Early Modern Cardinal. Leiden/Boston: Brill. ISBN 978-90-04-41544-7

External links

 Salvador Miranda. The Cardinals of the Holy Roman Church. A digital resource consisting of the biographical entries of the cardinals from 494 to 2014 and of the events and documents concerning the origin of the Roman cardinalate and its historical evolution
 Next Cardinal Creating Consistory by Pope Benedict XVI – The Required Background Data (including statistical data and links). Popes and the Papacy website (Anura Guruge). Retrieved 2010-09-08.
 GCatholic on all Cardinals
 List of All Cardinals By Precedence by GCatholic
 List of all Cardinal Titular Churches by GCatholic
 List of all Cardinal Deaconries by GCatholic
 Catholic-pages List of Cardinals
 Thomas J. Reese, Inside the Vatican: The Politics and Organization of the Catholic Church, Harvard University Press, 1996 
Cardinal Rating a website listing the day to day statements printed in the news by current cardinals

Bishops by type
Catholic ecclesiastical titles
Religious leadership roles